Pigs Ear is an unincorporated community  in Elk County, Pennsylvania, United States.

References

Unincorporated communities in Elk County, Pennsylvania
Unincorporated communities in Pennsylvania